Blosyropus spinosus, also known as the spiny longhorn or spiny silver-pine borer, is a rare species of longhorn beetle endemic to New Zealand. It has no specific Māori name, but the term for large longhorns of this type are howaka and kapapa.

Taxonomy 
B. spinosus was first described in 1868 by Ludwig Redtenbacher in his Reise der österreichischen Fregatte Novara um die Erde. The genus Blosyropus is often referred to within the subfamily Lepturinae, but is now considered to be in the Cerambycinae and the tribe Phlyctaenodini.

Distribution and habitat 
B. spinosus has been found in forest in many areas of New Zealand. Its larvae have been discovered in rotting logs of a variety of trees including tawa, Dracophyllum, pōhutukawa, manoao (silver pine), and red beech, as well as in podocarp forest. It is a Category I (indeterminate status) Threatened Species.

Description 
B. spinosus is one of the largest endemic beetles in New Zealand, growing to around 46mm long. It is nocturnal, and flightless. The hing wings are shortened or completely reduced in both sexes in this genus. B. spinosus is dark brown in colour with yellowish hairs on its body. Its key distinguishing characteristic is the pair of spines on its head, one above each eye, and the four spines on the pronotum in front of the elytra.

Behaviour 
The adult beetle is attracted to lights. Eggs are laid towards the top of the tree and the larva tunnel downwards as they feed on the rotting wood. Pupation occurs in a large pupal chamber at the base of the tree. This pupal chamber opens to the outside but is plugged with coarsely chewed wood that has not been digested by the larva. After completing metamorphosis, the beetle may overwinter or hibernate within the pupal chamber.

References

External links 

Beetles of New Zealand
Beetles described in 1868